The South African Railways Class GC 2-6-2+2-6-2 of 1924 was an articulated steam locomotive.

In 1924 and 1925, the South African Railways placed six Class GC Garratt articulated steam locomotives with a 2-6-2+2-6-2 Double Prairie type wheel arrangement in branch line service.

Manufacturer
Following the good performance of the Class GB branch line Garratts, the first locomotive to be built to the specifications of Colonel F.R. Collins DSO after he was appointed as the Chief Mechanical Engineer of the South African Railways in 1922 was a heavier  Double Prairie type Garratt, also intended for branch line work. It was designed and built to his specifications by Beyer, Peacock and Company in 1924.

Characteristics
Six locomotives were delivered in 1924 and were erected in the Durban shops of the SAR. They were placed in service in 1924 and 1925, designated Class GC and numbered in the range from 2180 to 2185. The locomotives were superheated, with Belpaire fireboxes, plate frames, Walschaerts valve gear and piston valves.

Like its predecessor Class GB, the heavier Class GC was also a branch line locomotive and its maximum axle load of  made it suitable for light rail. It was a more powerful development of the Class GB and was very similar to the Class GK Garratts which had been acquired by the New Cape Central Railway (NCCR) in 1923, but  heavier and with  smaller diameter cylinders with a  longer stroke.

Service
The locomotives were initially placed in service on the Natal South Coast line. Although they later also worked on other branch lines, they spent their entire working lives in Natal until they were withdrawn from service in 1962.

Illustration

References

2370
Beyer, Peacock locomotives
2-6-2+2-6-2 locomotives
Garratt locomotives
Cape gauge railway locomotives
Railway locomotives introduced in 1924
1924 in South Africa
Scrapped locomotives